Rolawn Limited is a turf grower and supplier based in the North of England in the East Riding of Yorkshire.

History 
Rolawn was founded in 1975 in Scotland before moving headquarters to England in Elvington, York. In 2017 Rolawn's Head Office moved to Seaton Ross, East Riding of Yorkshire.

Products 
 Turf
 Turfmaster system for volume turf laying

Rolawn Limited also produce other garden and landscaping products. These include a variety of topsoil, barks and mulches, lawn seed, lawn fertilisers and top dressing.

Certifications
Rolawn is certified to BS EN ISO 9001:2015 for its Quality Management System and BS EN ISO 14001:2015 for its Environmental Management System.

Science & Technology 
Between 2008 and 2009, Rolawn was involved in court action with a rival company called Turfmech which was accused of infringing Rolawn's intellectual property over the design of one of their super mowers. The matter was eventually settled out of court to avoid escalating costs, and Turfmech agreed not to actively pursue the 'wide mower' market.

Rolawn has developed unique technology to extend the shelf life of turf. Independent tests by the Sports Turf Research Institute concluded that the patented and trademarked Profresh® System significantly extends the shelf life of Rolawn turf, meaning it stays greener and fresher for longer.

In 2017 Rolawn commissioned independent research by the Sports Turf Research Industry into the rooting capabilities of thinner cut younger turf, which found that the younger thinner cut turf showed deeper, denser more vigorous rooting and superior visual appearance when compared to older thicker cut turf.

Trade Associations 
Rolawn is a member of the following trade organizations:
 British Association of Landscape Industries (BALI)
 Turfgrass Producers International (TPI)

Notable Figures

Nigel Forbes, 22nd Lord Forbes Nigel Forbes 
Nigel Forbes (b. 1918) was a Conservative politician, Scottish soldier and businessman in which capacity he was Chairman of Rolawn Limited from 1975 to 1998.

Kenneth E Dawson 
Kenneth E Dawson, the current chairman of Rolawn Limited became a Distinguished Honorary Member of Turfgrass Producers International (TPI) in recognition of his services to the turf grower's industry.

References 

Companies based in York
Horticultural companies of the United Kingdom
Gardening in the United Kingdom
Lawn care